La Pointe is a town in Ashland County in the U.S. state of Wisconsin. The population was 428 at the 2020 census. The town includes all of the Apostle Islands except for the westernmost four, which lie in the towns of Bayfield and Russell in Bayfield County. The town includes the unincorporated community of La Pointe on Madeline Island, the largest of the Apostle Islands (and the only one open for commercial development). The communities of Middleport and Old Fort are also located in the town. Its name in the Anishinaabe language is Mooningwanekaaning, meaning "The Home of the Golden Breasted Woodpecker".

Geography
According to the United States Census Bureau, the town has a total area of 78.0 square miles (201.9 km2), of which, 77.6 square miles (200.9 km2) of it is land and 0.4 square miles (1.0 km2) of it (0.50%) is water.

Madeline Island is part of the Town of La Pointe. County Highway H serves as a main route. Nearby is Chequamegon Bay, an inlet of Lake Superior.

Demographics

2020 census
As of the census of 2020, the population was 428. The racial makeup of the town was 88.1% White, 3.5% Black or African American, 1.4% Native American, 0.7% from other races, and 6.3% from two or more races. Ethnically, the population was 1.6% Hispanic or Latino of any race.

2000 census
As of the census of 2000, there were 246 people, 125 households, and 66 families residing in the town. The population density was 3.2 people per square mile (1.2/km2). There were 692 housing units at an average density of 8.9 per square mile (3.4/km2). The racial makeup of the town was 94.72% White, 1.63% Native American, 0.41% Pacific Islander, 0.41% from other races, and 2.85% from two or more races. Hispanic or Latino of any race were 0.41% of the population.

There were 125 households, out of which 22.4% had children under the age of 18 living with them, 44.0% were married couples living together, 4.8% had a female householder with no husband present, and 46.4% were non-families. 40.8% of all households were made up of individuals, and 13.6% had someone living alone who was 65 years of age or older. The average household size was 1.96 and the average family size was 2.64.

In the town, the population was spread out, with 19.1% under the age of 18, 2.8% from 18 to 24, 24.4% from 25 to 44, 34.1% from 45 to 64, and 19.5% who were 65 years of age or older. The median age was 46 years. For every 100 females, there were 119.6 males. For every 100 females age 18 and over, there were 116.3 males.

The median income for a household in the town was $33,500, and the median income for a family was $42,708. Males had a median income of $29,583 versus $31,042 for females. The per capita income for the town was $23,352. None of the families and 4.6% of the population were living below the poverty line, including no under eighteens and 2.1% of those over 64.

Government

Local government

The town employs a police and fire department and has a public library and elementary school; from sixth grade on, students attend school in Bayfield.

Federal and state representation

La Pointe is in Wisconsin's 7th congressional district, represented by Tom Tiffany (R); the 25th Wisconsin State Senate district, represented by Janet Bewley (D); and the 74th Wisconsin State Assembly district, represented by Beth Meyers (D).

Community

While the area encompassing the Town of La Pointe is made up of the entire Apostle Islands archipelago, the residents of the community live almost exclusively on Madeline Island, because Madeline is the only Apostle Island open to commercial development.

The community lies along the western shore of the island. Downtown is adjacent to the Madeline Island Ferry dock. There is a local post office on the main street, with the ZIP code 54850.

There is a small airport on Madeline Island and a ferry line between Madeline Island and the mainland.

See also
 Big Bay State Park
 Islands of the Midwest
 List of islands of the United States
 Populated islands of the Great Lakes

References

External links
Town of La Pointe official website
Madeline Island Ferry

Unincorporated communities in Ashland County, Wisconsin
Unincorporated communities in Wisconsin
Piers in Wisconsin